The LECOP was a bond issued by Argentine national government. LECOP (sometimes written as a common word, Lecop), stands for Letra de Cancelación de Obligaciones Provinciales ("Letter of Cancellation of Provincial Obligations").

These bonds were circulated at a substantial discount from their face value, so anybody accepting was bound to experience devaluation (or inflation). While LECOPs were intended as a means to replace legal currency (Argentine pesos) at a time when cash was scarce, there were occasions in which LECOPs were not accepted as valid means of payment — most notably, most taxes could only be paid in pesos, or only partly paid in LECOPs. Public utility companies generally restricted the percentage acceptable to a 70-30 ratio, sometimes further limiting LECOP usage to 15% of the total bill.

Other complementary currencies in Argentina at that time where the Crédito, the Patacón and the Argentino.

Currencies of Argentina
Bonds (finance)